Armudly is a village in the Kalbajar District of Azerbaijan.

History
This village was occupied by the self-proclaimed Republic of Artsakh during the First Nagorno-Karabakh War, but was returned to Azerbaijani control on 25 October 2020. It is suspected that this village has undergone a name change or no longer exists, as no Azerbaijani website mentions it under this name.

References
 

Populated places in Kalbajar District